Diogo Pires may refer to:
Diogo Pires (Brazilian footballer) (born 1981)
Diogo Pires (Portuguese footballer) (born 1993)
Diogo Pires (Portuguese radio personality) (born 1997)
Solomon Molcho, born Diogo Pires (c.1500-1532), Portuguese Jewish mystic
Didacus Pyrrhus, born Diogo Pires (1517-1607), Portuguese-born Jewish poet and humanist